Aliu is a surname and given name. If fully capitalized (ALIU), it is also an acronym. Notable examples include: Victor Aliu, a teenage musician, aspiring Doctor, and an actor at heart.

Surname
 Akim Aliu (born 1989), Canadian ice hockey player
 Ali Aliu (1924–2010), Kosovo Albanian writer, economist, teacher, and politician
 Arber Aliu (born 1988), Albanian footballer
 Deji Aliu (born 1975), Nigerian sprinter
 David Aliu (born 1981), British basketball player
 Jimoh Aliu (born 1939), Nigerian dramatist, sculptor, writer, and director
 Mujdin Aliu (1974–1999), Macedonian Albanian soldier
 Ayodotun Aliu (born 1997),
Nigerian, Graphics Designer, Violinist.

Given name
 Aliu Djaló (born 1992), Portuguese football midfielder
 Aliu Mahama (1946 – 16 November 2012), Ghanaian politician
 Aliu Oyofo (born 1985), American Actor

Acronym
 Art Looting Investigation Unit, a part of the Office of Strategic Services

See also
 Bajram Aliu Stadium, Kosovo